Madison Place is a census-designated place (CDP) in Hamilton County, Ohio, United States, adjacent to the city of Cincinnati. It was first listed as a CDP prior to the 2020 census.

The CDP is in eastern Hamilton County, in Columbia Township. It is bordered to the west and the south by the Madisonville neighborhood of Cincinnati and to the northeast by The Village of Indian Hill. A very small portion of the southeast corner of the CDP is bordered to the south by the village of Mariemont.

References 

Census-designated places in Hamilton County, Ohio
Census-designated places in Ohio